Imaging Technology News (ITN) is a business-to-business trade publication that serves healthcare professionals in the fields of radiology, radiation oncology, women’s health and nuclear medicine.  ITN'''s print, website and digital media cover improvements and trends in medical imaging and radiation oncology technology.

The print publication had 34,901 subscribers as of July 2013.

ITN covers and exhibits with the following organizations: Radiological Society of North America, the American Society for Therapeutic Radiology and Oncology, the Society of Nuclear Medicine and Molecular Imaging and the American Association of Physicists in Medicine.

 History ITN launched in 1961 as Medical Electronics & Equipment News, which became MEEN in the 1980s. MEEN became Imaging Technology News in September 1999, which then became ITN'' in September 2011.

References

External links 
 Imaging Technology News (ITN) website
 Scranton Gillette Communications, Inc. - Website

Business magazines published in the United States
Magazines published in Illinois
Magazines established in 1961
Medical magazines
Oncology journals
Radiology and medical imaging journals